Abney may refer to:
 Abney (surname), includes a list of people with the name
 Abney effect, a colour-related phenomenon

Places
 Abney, Derbyshire, a village in the county of Derbyshire, England
 Abney, West Virginia, a locality in Raleigh County, West Virginia, United States 
 Abney Grange, a village in the county of Derbyshire, England

See also
 Abney Park
 Abney Hall
 Abney and Abney Grange
 Topographic Abney level